Unitus Plaza (formerly Hoffman Columbia Plaza) is a building at 1300 SW 6th Avenue in Portland, Oregon. The structure was purchased by Menashe Properties in 2018.

References

Buildings and structures in Portland, Oregon
Southwest Portland, Oregon